Lucius O'Brien may refer to:

Lucius O'Brien (died 1717)
Sir Lucius O'Brien, 3rd Baronet (1731–1795), Member of the Parliament of Ireland
Lucius O'Brien, 13th Baron Inchiquin (1800–1872), Irish politician and nobleman
Lucius O'Brien, 15th Baron Inchiquin (1864–1929)
Lucius Richard O'Brien (1832–1899), Canadian painter
Lucius O'Brien (priest) (1842–1913), Dean of Limerick in the Church of Ireland